Necia H. Apfel (born July 31, 1930) is an American astronomer, author and educator.

Personal life

She graduated magna cum laude from Tufts University and did graduate work at Radcliffe College and Northwestern University. Apfel has lectured about astronomy to children in the Chicago area and taught courses on the teaching of astronomy at National-Louis University in Evanston, Illinois. She is author of two college textbooks on astronomy and ten books for children. Apfel lives in Highland Park, Illinois. She is currently retired and is a volunteer and past President of the Friends of the Highland Park Public Library.

Bibliography
It's All Elementary: From Atoms to the Quantum World of Quarks, Leptons and Gluons, Lothrop, Lee & Shepard Books (c1985), 
Nebulae: The Birth and Death of Stars, Lothrop, Lee & Shepard Books (c1988) 
Voyager to the Planets, Clarion Books (c1991), 
It's All Relative: Einstein's Theory of Relativity, with diagrams by Yukio Kondo, Lothrop, Lee & Shepard Books (c1981), 
Astronomy and Planetology: Projects for Young Scientists, F. Watts (1983)
Arco Astronomy Projects for Young Scientists, Arco Pub (c1984), 
Architecture of the Universe, with J. Allen Hynek, Benjamin/Cummings (c1979), 
Orion, The Hunter, Clarion Books (c1995), 
Space Station (First Books), F. Watts (1987), 
Moon and Its Exploration: A First Book (First Books), F. Watts (1982), 
Stars and Galaxies. (1982) ISBN  0-531-04389-4

References 

American children's writers
Living people
1930 births
20th-century American astronomers
American women astronomers
Tufts University alumni
Radcliffe College alumni
Northwestern University alumni
National Louis University faculty
20th-century American women scientists
21st-century American women